is a Japanese former wrestler who competed in the 1972 Summer Olympics.

References

External links
 

1951 births
Living people
Olympic wrestlers of Japan
Wrestlers at the 1972 Summer Olympics
Japanese male sport wrestlers
Place of birth missing (living people)
Wrestlers at the 1974 Asian Games
Asian Games competitors for Japan
20th-century Japanese people
21st-century Japanese people